Bruce Harold Lipton (born October 21, 1944) is an American developmental biologist noted for his views on epigenetics.

In his book The Biology of Belief, he claims that beliefs control human biology rather than DNA and inheritance. Lipton's contentious claims have not received attention from mainstream science.

Biography
Lipton received a B.A. in biology from C.W. Post Campus of Long Island University in 1966 and a PhD in developmental biology from the University of Virginia in 1971. From 1973 to 1982, he taught anatomy at the  University of Wisconsin School of Medicine, before joining St. George's University School of Medicine as a professor of anatomy for three years. Lipton has said that sometime in the 1980s, he rejected atheism and came to believe that the way cells function demonstrates the existence of God.

From 1987 to 1992, Lipton was involved in research at Pennsylvania State University and Stanford University Medical Center. Since 1993, he has been teaching in non-tenured positions at primarily alternative and chiropractic colleges and schools.

Lipton has said, "When I first started back in the '70s and my research was coming out, it was the golden age of genes. My research irritated a lot of people. I always thought of them as lemmings running off the cliff of DNA, and I'm standing there on the side with the results from my stem-cell studies thinking, 'Oh my God, you're all going the wrong way.' At some point I realised that they marginalised my work because it didn't conform to their conventional beliefs and I thought, well, they're not even being scientists. And I just left the system. I realised the message is more important for the average person than it is to argue in the halls of science".

Lipton has received the 2009 Goi Peace Award.

Reception
In 2010, in her opinion column in the journal Frontiers in Ecology and the Environment, Katherine Ellison wrote that Lipton "remains on the sidelines of conventional discussions of epigenetics", and quoted him saying he was basically ignored by mainstream science.

In Science-Based Medicine, professor David Gorski described Lipton as a "well-known crank" and likened his idea to the law of attraction, also known as "The Secret": "wanting something badly enough makes it so".

Books
 The Biology of Belief  – Unleashing the Power of Consciousness, Matter & Miracles (2005)
 Spontaneous Evolution: Our Positive Future and a Way to Get There from Here (2010)
 The Honeymoon Effect: The Science of Creating Heaven on Earth (2013)
 The Biology of Belief - 10th Anniversary Edition (2015)

See also
 New Thought
 Paul Pearsall
 Quantum mysticism

References

External links
 

1944 births
Living people
21st-century American biologists
21st-century American non-fiction writers
Developmental biologists
Former atheists and agnostics
Pennsylvania State University faculty
People from Mount Kisco, New York
Pseudoscientific biologists
Scientists from New York (state)
Quantum mysticism advocates
University of Virginia alumni
University of Wisconsin–Madison faculty